Chole can refer to:
 Chloe. a feminine given name
Chole (woreda), one of the 180 woredas in the Oromia region of Ethiopia
Chole, cooked or uncooked chickpeas
Chole masala, another name for chana masala, a chickpea dish in South Asia sometimes simply called "chole"
Chole bhature, a combination of chana masala and fried bread called bhatura
Chole-, a Latin prefix meaning bile
"Chole", medical slang for cholecystitis, or a patient with cholecystitis
"Chole", also medical slang for a cholecystectomy
Chole, a probable antecedent of the sport of golf
"Chole", nickname for Soledad, California, as used by Chicano gangs
Chole Shamba, another name for Mafia Island, part of the Tanzanian Zanzibar Archipelago
Kate Chole, a minor fictional character in the BBC soap opera EastEnders

See also
Cholecystokinin
Cholesterol
Chloe (disambiguation)